The Brunet–Calaf Residence (Spanish: Residencia Brunet–Calaf) is a historic structure and former residence located in the historic center of the Puerto Rican municipality of Manatí. The residence was added to the United States National Register of Historic Places in 1988. The house, along with a portion of the city hall of Manatí, was destroyed by a fire in 2016.

The Brunet-Calaf House occupied the western third of a block next to the church and the main plaza of Manatí. It had two stories, the lower one dedicated to commercial uses and the upper one residential. It was one of the most impressive of the nineteenth century townhouse of Manatí. This building agglutinates a diversity of stylistic tendencies which were common to Manatí's architectural history between 1850 and 1910. Its irregular massing and proportioning are very interesting and elegantly blended as are the different architectural history borne out by local builders and artisans whose names have long been forgotten. It well can be said that the Brunet-Calaf House is a compendium of the towns evolving building and crafts tradition during the second half of the nineteenth century.

Gallery

See also
 Plaza del Mercado de Manatí

References 

National Register of Historic Places in Manatí, Puerto Rico
Spanish Colonial architecture in Puerto Rico
Houses on the National Register of Historic Places in Puerto Rico
Houses completed in 1850
Burned buildings and structures
Ruined houses
Fires in Puerto Rico
2016 in Puerto Rico
2016 fires in North America
1850 establishments in Puerto Rico